Chintalapudi may refer to the following in Andhra Pradesh, India:

Chintalapudi, Duggirala mandal, a village in Duggirala mandal, Guntur district
Chintalapudi, West Godavari district, a village in West Godavari district
 Chintalapudi, Chandarlapadu
Chintalapudi mandal
Chintalapudi (SC) (Assembly constituency)